Brett William Codlin (born 29 November 1956) is a former New Zealand rugby union player. A full-back, Codlin represented Canterbury and Counties at a provincial level, and was a member of the New Zealand national side, the All Blacks, in 1980. He played 13 matches for the All Blacks including three internationals.

References

1956 births
Living people
People educated at King's College, Auckland
Lincoln University (New Zealand) alumni
New Zealand rugby union players
New Zealand international rugby union players
Canterbury rugby union players
Counties Manukau rugby union players
Rugby union fullbacks
Rugby union players from the Auckland Region